Alexander Township is a township in Benton County, in the U.S. state of Missouri.

Alexander Township was formed on February 13, 1838, taking its name from Judge George Alexander, who settled on Turkey Creek in 1832.

References

Townships in Missouri
Townships in Benton County, Missouri